Canadian Bacon, elevation , is a peak in the Cascade range in Washington state. This summit in North Cascades National Park has not been officially named by the U.S. Board on Geographic Names.

Nearby peaks
 Electric Butte
 Mount Watson
 Logger Butte
 Bacon Peak
 Mount Despair

References

North Cascades National Park
Mountains of Washington (state)
North Cascades of Washington (state)
Mountains of Whatcom County, Washington